Marcelić is a Croatian surname. Notable people with the surname include:

 Bruno Marcelić (1943-2016), Croatian basketball player
 Davor Marcelić, Croatian basketball player
 Ivan Marcelić, Croatian water polo player 

Croatian surnames
Patronymic surnames
Surnames from given names